Mansiri Himal is a small, high subrange of the Himalayas in north-central Nepal, about  northwest of Kathmandu.  The Marsyangdi River separates the Mansiri from the Annapurnas to the southwest, then an upper tributary Dudh Khola separates Peri Himal to the northwest.  On the east side, the Burhi (Budhi) Gandaki separates the Mansiri from Ganesh Himal, Serang or Sringi Himal and Kutang Himal.  All these streams are tributary to the Gandaki.

The Mansiri range is also known as Manaslu Himal or the Gurkha Massif. It contains these peaks among Earth's twenty highest (with at least 500m topographic prominence):
 Manaslu, 8th highest
 Himalchuli, 18th highest
 Ngadi Chuli, 20th highest

The Mansiri range is notable for its local relief.

References

Mountain ranges of Nepal